Tu Kahibu Na Mu is an Indian Odia-language romantic drama film directed by Susant Mani and produced by Tarang Cine Productions.  It stars Niharika Dash and Amlan Das in lead roles while Aparajita Mohanty and Mihir Das play supporting roles. The music is released by Amara Muzik.

Cast

 Niharika Dash
 Amlan Das
 Aparajita Mohanty
 Mihir Das
 Akash Das Nayak
 Papu Pom Pom
 Jairam Samal

Awards
28th Odisha State Film Awards
Best Music Director: Goodli Rath 
Best Playback Singer - Male: Shashank

References

External links 

2010s Odia-language films
Films directed by Susant Mani
2016 films